Gunnel Elisabet Fred (born 29 August 1955) is a Swedish film actress.

Selected filmography
 Midsommar (2019)
 Saraband (2003)
 Details (2003)
 In the Presence of a Clown (1997)
 Private Confessions (1996)
 Underground Secrets (1991)
 The Land Before Time (1988)
 Åke and His World (1984)

References

External links

1955 births
Living people
Actresses from Stockholm
20th-century Swedish actresses
21st-century Swedish actresses